Everard Burnside Butler (December 28, 1885 – November 23, 1958) was a Canadian rower who won a bronze medal in the single sculls at the 1912 Summer Olympics.

Butler started training in rowing in 1908, and next year won his first junior race. By 1910 he rowed as a senior in the United States and Canada, and in 1911 won two US national titles, in the single sculls and quarter-mile dash. He defended those titles in 1912, and won the quarter-mile dash again in 1914. Butler fought in World War I with the 12th Artillery Brigade, and suffered extensive injuries in a mustard gas attack in France. Consequently, after the war he retired from major rowing competitions and worked as an accountant. He returned to the army during World War II and served with the 48th Highlanders and Royal Canadian Ordnance Corps.

References

External links

 

1885 births
1958 deaths
Canadian male rowers
Olympic rowers of Canada
Rowers at the 1912 Summer Olympics
Rowers from Toronto
Olympic bronze medalists for Canada
Olympic medalists in rowing
Medalists at the 1912 Summer Olympics